The Henneicke Column was a group of  Dutch  Nazi collaborators working in the investigative division of the Central Bureau for Jewish Emigration (Zentralstelle für jüdische Auswanderung), with headquarters in Amsterdam, during the Nazi Germany occupation of the Netherlands in World War II. 

Between March and October 1943 the group, led by former auto mechanic  and Willem Briedé, was responsible for tracking down Jews in hiding and arresting them. The group arrested and "delivered" to the Nazi authorities 8,000-9,000 Jews. Most of them were deported to Westerbork concentration camp and later shipped to and murdered in Sobibor and other German extermination camps.

The bounty paid to Henneicke Column members for each captured Jew was 7.50 guilders (equivalent to about US $4.75). The group, consisting of 18 core members, ended its work and was disbanded on October 1, 1943. However, the Column’s leaders continued working for Hausraterfassungsstelle (Household property registration office), tracking down hidden Jewish property. 

Before Nazi Germany retreated from the Netherlands in May 1945, Wim Henneicke was assassinated by the Dutch resistance in December 1944 in Amsterdam. Willem Briedé escaped the country and settled in Germany. In 1949 he was tried by a Dutch court in absentia and received the death penalty. The sentence was never carried out; Briedé died of natural causes in Germany in January 1962. 

The history of the Henneicke Column was researched by Dutch journalist Ad van Liempt, who in 2002 published in the Netherlands A Price on Their Heads, Kopgeld, Dutch bounty hunters in search of Jews, 1943.

List of members
The following list is incomplete. In total there were 53 Dutch and one German working for the Column:
Willem Christian Heinrich (Wim) Henneicke (1909-1944), liquidated by the Amsterdam resistance
William Henry Benjamin (William) Briedé (1903-1962), sentenced to death in absentia
Hermanus Maria Peter (Herman) Bartelsman (1881-1947), sentenced to death. Executed by firing squad March 6, 1947
Frederik H. Meijer (1900-1947), sentenced to death. Executed by firing squad 28 March 1947
Bernard Andreas Dries Riphagen (1909-1973), escaped, never convicted
Sera de Croon (1916, Amsterdam), sentenced to death, later pardoned
Eduard Gijsbertus (Eddy) Moesbergen (1902-1980), sentenced to death, later pardoned
Christoffel (Chris) Bont (1906), sentenced to death, later pardoned
Hendricus Christiaan (Henk) Saatrübe (1909-1983), sentenced to death, later pardoned
Hendrik (Henk) van der Kraan (1897), sentenced to death, later pardoned
Martin Hinze (1913), sentenced to death, later pardoned
Hendrik Hofman (1892), sentenced to death, later pardoned
Diederik van der Kraan (1921), sentenced to death, later pardoned
Jacob Rigter (1912), sentenced to death, later pardoned
Jan Rutgers (1911), sentenced to death, later pardoned
Hugo Berten Heinrich (1890), fled, never convicted
Bruno Barend (Bob) Vlugt (1917), sentenced to life imprisonment
Richard Kop
Johan van Zeulen
Lambert Schiffer

References

Bounty hunters
Dutch collaborators with Nazi Germany
Far-right politics in the Netherlands
Jewish Dutch history
The Holocaust in the Netherlands